
This is a list of aircraft in alphabetical order beginning with 'S'.

References

Further reading

External links

 List Of Aircraft (S)